= Claire Massey =

New Zealand agribusiness academic

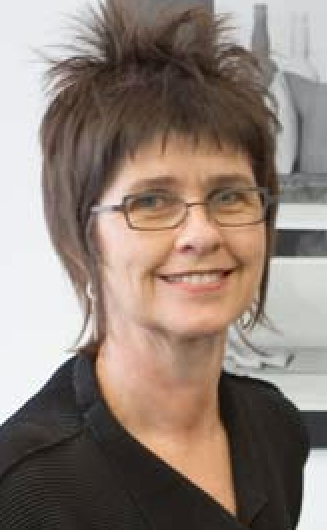
- Education: Massey University
- Scientific career
- Fields: Agribusiness
- Workplaces: Massey University
- Thesis: The role of the external consultant in facilitating enterprise development (1999)

Claire Massey is a New Zealand agribusiness academic. As of 2018, she is a full professor at the Massey University.

== Academic career ==
After a 1999 PhD titled The role of the external consultant in facilitating enterprise development at Massey University, Massey joined the staff, rising to full professor.

For almost a decade Massey was chair of the Wellington Jewish Community Centre.

== Selected works ==
- Cameron, Alan Ferguson, and Claire Massey. Small and medium-sized enterprises: A New Zealand perspective. Longman, 1999.
- Sligo, F. X., and Claire Massey. "Risk, trust and knowledge networks in farmers' learning." Journal of Rural Studies 23, no. 2 (2007): 170–182.
- Flett, Ross, Fiona Alpass, Steve Humphries, Claire Massey, Stuart Morriss, and Nigel Long. "The technology acceptance model and use of technology in New Zealand dairy farming." Agricultural Systems 80, no. 2 (2004): 199–211.
- Massey, Claire, and Robyn Walker. "Aiming for organisational learning: consultants as agents of change." The Learning Organization 6, no. 1 (1999): 38–44.
- Lewis, Kate, and Claire Massey. "Delivering enterprise education in New Zealand." Education+ Training 45, no. 4 (2003): 197–206.
